gentoo is a free file manager for Linux and other Unix-like computer systems created by Emil Brink. It is licensed under the GNU General Public License.

gentoo is written in C using the GTK+ toolkit, and the "two-pane" concept. What makes gentoo stand out are its graphical configurability and its file typing and styling system. Using the latter, gentoo identifies the type of your files and then uses the style you've defined for the type to determine how to display it in listings. It is reminiscent of Total Commander or Norton Commander, and according to author himself, gentoo tries to capture the features, the look and feel of the legendary file manager from Amiga platform: Directory Opus. 

The package includes a set of approximately one-hundred unique handcrafted icons for many different types of files. Additionally, many users like it for its speed, as it is relatively lightweight (see below).

Name
The word gentoo refers to a fast breed of penguin, the gentoo penguin. In spite of the name, it has nothing to do with the Gentoo Linux distribution, and did in fact adopt the name first.

See also

 Comparison of file managers

References

External links

File managers that use GTK
Orthodox file managers
Free file managers
Free software programmed in C